Athletics at the 1987 Mediterranean Games were held in Latakia, Syria.

Results

Men's events

Women's events

Medal table

References

External links
Complete 1987 Mediterranean Games Standings

Med
Athletics
1987
International athletics competitions hosted by Syria